Enseigne Gabolde was a destroyer built for the French Navy. She was condemned in 1938 and subsequently scrapped.

Design and description
She displaced  at normal load and her crew numbered 80 men.

The ship was powered by a pair of Parsons steam turbines, each driving one propeller shaft using steam provided by four Normand boilers.

The primary armament of Enseigne Gabolde consisted of three  Modèle 1893 guns in single mounts, one superfiring pair forward of the superstructure and the remaining gun on a platform on the stern. For anti-aircraft defense she was equipped with a single  AA gun. The ship was also fitted with two twin mounts for  torpedo tubes amidships.

Construction and career
Enseigne Gabolde was ordered from Chantiers et Ateliers Augustin Normand and was laid down on 26 June 1914. Construction was suspended later that year and did not resume until 1918 after the design was modified. The ship was launched on 23 April 1921 and was finally completed in 1923. She was struck in 1938.

Citations

References

 
 

Destroyers of the French Navy
Ships built in France
1921 ships